Somnath is one of the 182 Legislative Assembly constituencies of Gujarat state in India. It is part of Gir Somnath district.

List of segments
This assembly seat represents the following segments, also this assembly has major city  Somnath and 53 villages. Somnath is also in this assembly so this is important to win for all parties. Gir Somnath district's main capital is Somnath.

 Veraval Taluka

Members of the Legislative Assembly

Election results

2022 
 

-->

2017

2014

2012

See also
 List of constituencies of Gujarat Legislative Assembly
 Gujarat Legislative Assembly

References

External links
 

Assembly constituencies of Gujarat
Gir Somnath district